AVR may refer to:

Railroad 
 Allegheny Valley Railroad, shortline railroad in Pennsylvania, U.S.
 Aroostook Valley Railroad, a defunct railroad in Maine, U.S.
 Assiniboine Valley Railway, a minimum gauge railway in Winnipeg, Canada
 Avon Valley Railway, a heritage railway in the United Kingdom

Radio 
 Aboriginal Voices Radio, an Aboriginal Canadian national radio network
 Annapolis Valley Radio, a country station located in Kentville, Nova Scotia

Electronics 
 AVR microcontrollers, a family of microcontrollers originally developed by Atmel, now part of Microchip Technology
 Audio/video receiver, a home theater electronic component
 Acronym for augmented reality and virtual reality interactive experiences
 Automatic voltage regulator

Other uses 
 Armed violence reduction
 Aortic valve replacement
 Automatic voter registration
 Avacyn Restored
 AVR reactor, a German prototype pebble bed reactor
 Avirulence gene, "Avr"
 Auxiliary Vessel, Rescue or Aircraft Vessel, Rescue
 Lead augmented vector right (aVR), a voltage difference in electrocardiography